Photograph is the third album by Philippine singer, Ariel Rivera. The album was released three years after his second due to his acting career. It features the hits, "Narito Ako" and "I Must Have Loved You".

Track listing
 "Photograph" (Nori Villena)
 "Narito Ako" (Angel Panti)
 "In My Life" (Christine Bendebel)
 "If This Isn't Heaven" (Trina Belamide)
 "Sana Ay Ulitin Natin" (Alex Catedrilla)
 "A Woman's Need" (Panti)
 "Minamahal Pala Kita" (Tito Cayamanda)
 "Somewhere... Someday" (Panti)
 "I Must Have Loved You" (Belamide)
 "Anong Nangyari" (Aaron Paul del Rosario)

References

1995 albums
Ariel Rivera albums